Lipopolysaccharide-induced tumor necrosis factor-alpha factor is a protein that in humans is encoded by the LITAF gene.

It is associated with Charcot–Marie–Tooth disease 1C.

References

External links
  GeneReviews/NCBI/NIH/UW entry on Charcot-Marie-Tooth Neuropathy Type 1

Further reading